The Bukoshi Oak is a natural heritage monument of botanical character, located in the village of Bukosh in Vushtrri Municipality, Kosovo.

History 
The Bukoshi Oak is an oak tree (genus Quercus) with trunk perimeter dimensions which at the base of the trunk are 3.10 cm (1.22 in) while the maximum length / height of its crown is about 22 m (72 ft ). Its exact age is not known, but it is said that when the construction of the railway line  Skopje - Fushë Kosova - Mitrovica began, this oak was a small sapling near a freshwater spring. (It is known that the construction of this railway was completed in 1874). Near the oak, at the site of a former freshwater spring, there is now a well, which also gives the monument a hydrological character too.

See also 
 Natural heritage
 Natural monument

References

External links 
 Kosovo Environmental Protection Agency - Official Website 

Individual oak trees
Individual trees in Kosovo